María Eugenia Flórez (born 3 February 1981), artistically known as  Fátima Flórez, is an Argentine actress, impersonator and comedian.

She is mainly known for having been the host alongside Gabriela Sobrado of Plan TV, and for her imitations of former president Cristina Fernández de Kirchner in Periodismo para todos.

She has won two Martín Fierro Awards (2013 and 2015), thanks to his imitations in Journalism for Everyone and ShowMatch, while for her work in theater she has won four Carlos Awards, five Estrella de Mar Awards and five VOS Awards and is the only artist from Argentina that won three golds (2 Carlos de Oro and 1 Estrella de Mar de Oro) in theater seasons.

Biography 
He was born in Olivos and lived there throughout his childhood until high school. He played hockey from the ages of 6 to 14. His father was an architect and his mother a geography teacher. He has a sister two years older.

During elementary school he would do impressions of his teachers and professors, particularly the 5th grade teacher, Norma Kauffman, who had a particular way of speaking.

She started her career by studying and taking acting, dancing and singing classes. Meanwhile, she performed imitations as a hobby, where her first character was Xuxa.

She began at the age of 17, taking part as a dancer and choreography assistant in different works directed by Pepe Cibrián Campoy, such as “The Hunchback of Paris”, “Drácula” and “King David”.

In the year 2000 she joined the musical group Las Primas, (Las Primas del 2000).
In 2001, at the age of 20, she traveled with them to Peru, where they participated in the TV program La Paisana Jacinta, and it was there that she married her current husband and first boyfriend, Norberto Marcos (66 years old), who at that time produced said women's group. He discovered her gift as a mimic in privacy. Because Norberto is very devoted to the Virgin of Fátima, she advised him to give himself this artistic name, which he considered would have a greater impact on the public.

In 2005 she was hired by Carlos Perciavalle as the main star, to lead his show “Revivamos el Concert” together with him. She also joins the cast of the program  "No hay 2 sin 3" , along with Pablo Granados, Pachu Peña and Freddy Villareal. Likewise, she had the opportunity to lead the play “The World of Laughter” and El Viaje del Humor, along with Jorge Corona, where in addition to being a dancer she began to stand out for taking perform some imitations.

She served as co-host and comedian in the program From 9 to 12, along with Maby Wells and Macu Mazucca, where she was characterized by imitating Natalia Fassi; She participated in the program "Laughter is beautiful", together with Freddy Villarreal, and in the cycle "In the manner of Sofovich" with Gerardo Sofovich. In addition, she served as a comedian in the program "El muro infernal", along with Marley.

In 2009, he was part of the program De lo Nuestro lo peor... y lo mejor program hosted by Fabián Gianola that was broadcast on Channel 13, where he played "the computer". That same year he stood out for being part of the program Showmatch, hosted by Marcelo Tinelli, within the segment Gran Cuñado and Gran Cuñado VIP, where he personified Nacha Guevara, Viviana Canosa and Silvia Süller.

In 2011, she ventured as host of the program Plan TV broadcast by eltrece, together with Gabriela Sobrado, where, in addition to hosting, she performs various imitations.

In 2012 he was part of the program Periodismo para todos broadcast by eltrece, hosted by Jorge Lanata, where he stands out for imitating the Argentine president Cristina Fernández de Kirchner among other political figures. But after three years of participating, the production of the program decided to remove the humor section, focusing more on journalistic reports.

In 2013 she leads her own show "Fatima Florez es Única", under the artistic direction of her husband Norberto Marcos and the production of Daniel Faroni at the Provincial Theater of Mar del Plata, in which she plays 30 different characters. The show continued in Buenos Aires, Villa Carlos Paz and on tour around the interior of the country.

In 2014 he participated in Showmatch, doing various imitations of public figures that were part of the contest Bailando 2014, parodying both the participants and the members of the jury. Also that same year he made his film debut with Luis Scalela and Carlos Mentasti in the film "Bañeros 4: Los Rompeolas", where he played Kiara, the owner of an aquarium who must prevent her property from being stolen.

In 2016, she is again part of Showmatch in the segment Gran Cuñado, in which she stands out for imitating the former president Cristina Fernández de Kirchner, the governor of Buenos Aires María Eugenia Vidal, the vice president Gabriela Michetti, the deputy Elisa Carrió and Vicky Xipolitakis together with José Otavis.

In 2017, she stood out as a comedian on the program Susana Giménez, performing imitations in the sketch of "The Public Employee" as Cristina Fernández de Kirchner, Silvia Suller, Gladys "La bomba tucumana" and the same Susana Giménez; she also impersonated guests, performed musicals and medleys.

She currently can imitate more than 100 characters. She frequently appears as a guest on TV interviews, magazine releases, game and entertainment shows, etc.

Theater

Television

Cinema

Characters 

 Alejandra Maglietti
 Andrea Rincon
 Aschira
 Adabel Guerrero
 Barbie Velez
 Beatrice Solomon
 French Nativity
 Britney Spears
 Carina Zampini
 Carmen Barbieri
 Catherine Fulop
 Charlotte Caniggia
 Claribel Medina
 Cristina Kirchner
 Celia Cruz
 Chinese Skunk
 Coki Ramírez
 Emerald Miter
 Gabriela Michetti
 Gabriela Sabatini
 Gladys Florimonte (as Zulma of Tinelli)
 Gladys, the Tucuman bombshell
 Gilda
 Graciela Alfano
 Iliana Calabro
 Jennifer Lopez
 Jessica Cirio
 Justin Bieber
 Karina, the Little Princess
 Karina Jelinek
 Karina Rabolini
 The Tucuman Bomb
 Lady Gaga
 Lali Esposito
 Laura Fidalgo
 Amaia Montero
 Lia Crucet
 Liza Minnelli
 Lita de Lazari
 Lilita Carrio
 Lucia Galan
 Luis Miguel
 Madonna
 Marcela Colonel
 Marge Simpson
 Maria Eugenia Ritó
 Maria Eugenia Vidal
 Mariana Fabbiani
 Mariana Nannis
 Marixa Balli
 Marta Sanchez
 Maru Botana
 Mercedes Sosa
 Michael Jackson
 Mariela "Mimi" Alvarado
 Mirtha Legrand
 Moria Casán
 Nacha Guevara
 Natalia Fassi
 Panam
 Patricia Sosa
 Patricia Bullrich
 Paula Chavez
 Paulina Rubio
 Rafaella Carrá
 Shakira
 Silvia Süller
 Silvina Escudero
 Soledad Pastorutti
 Soledad Silveyra
 Susana Giménez
 Susana Roccasalvo
 Tina Turner
 Thalía
 Teresa Parodi
 Tita Merello
 Valeria Lynch
 Vicky Xipolitakis
 Viviana Canosa
 Xuxa
 Yanina Latorre

Awards and nominations

Television Awards

Theater Awards

See also 

 eltrece
 Showmatch
 Bailando 2021
 Periodismo para todos

References 

Argentine actresses
Bailando por un Sueño (Argentine TV series) participants
1981 births
Living people